The 1923 Iowa Hawkeyes football team represented the University of Iowa in the 1923 Big Ten Conference football season. This season was Howard Jones' last as head coach of the Hawkeyes.

Schedule

References

Iowa
Iowa Hawkeyes football seasons
Iowa Hawkeyes football